Oluwaseun Kolawole Anubi (born 24 March 1987 in Zaria) is a Nigerian football player currently with Warri Wolves F.C.

Career
Anubi moved from Insurance in 2004 to Brazilian top club Sport Club Internacional and turned in July 2005 back to Insurance, later he moved in 2006 to Enyimba International F.C. After moving to Dolphins F.C., he was loaned out in 2008 to Akwa United F.C. In September 2008 he returned to Enyimba. then later played in 2009 at Sharks of Port Harcourt.

International
He was a member of the Nigerian team at 2005 FIFA World Youth Championship in the Netherlands where he played two games. He used to be a member of the Nigerian team at 2003 FIFA U-17 World Championship in Finland and played all three games.

References

External links
 FIFA
 Player Profile

1987 births
Living people
Nigerian footballers
Nigeria under-20 international footballers
Nigerian expatriate footballers
Association football midfielders
Sport Club Internacional players
Enyimba F.C. players
Dolphin F.C. (Nigeria) players
Nigerian expatriate sportspeople in Brazil
Bendel Insurance F.C. players
Kaduna United F.C. players
Akwa United F.C. players
Pepsi Football Academy players
Expatriate footballers in Brazil
People from Zaria
Yoruba sportspeople